Rainford Kalaba (born 14 August 1986) is a Zambian professional footballer who plays for TP Mazembe.

Career
Kalaba was born in Kitwe.

He signed a five-year contract with Primeira Liga side Braga in April 2008.

In October 2013, due to a disagreement between their club TP Mazembe and the Zambian Football Association over international call-ups, Kalaba and two other players (Nathan Sinkala and Stoppila Sunzu) were the subject of a Zambian arrest warrant. All three players later had their passports confiscated by Zambian immigration authorities, before being pardoned by the Zambian government.

He made his 100th international appearance against Mozambique national football team in June 2017 but was substituted in a 1–0 defeat and was in the opinion of national team manager Wedson Nyirenda too hasty to return to the dressing room rather than watch his teammates and needed to be disciplined. He was not chosen in the squads for the 2018 World Cup qualifying matches against Algeria national football team and Nigeria national football team in autumn 2017.

International goals
Scores and results list Zambia's goal tally first.

Honours
ZESCO United
 Primera Division de Zambia: 2007
 Zambian Cup: 2006

TP Mazembe
 Linafoot: 2011, 2012, 2013, 2013–14, 2015–16
 CAF Champions League: 2015
 CAF Super Cup: 2011, 2016
 CAF Confederation Cup: 2016

Zambia
 Africa Cup of Nations: 2012

See also
 List of footballers with 100 or more caps

References

External links
 
 
 TP Mazembe Profile

1986 births
Living people
People from Kitwe
Zambian footballers
Zambia international footballers
Zambian expatriate footballers
2008 Africa Cup of Nations players
2010 Africa Cup of Nations players
2012 Africa Cup of Nations players
Association football midfielders
2013 Africa Cup of Nations players
Gil Vicente F.C. players
S.C. Braga players
U.D. Leiria players
TP Mazembe players
Africa Cup of Nations-winning players
2015 Africa Cup of Nations players
ZESCO United F.C. players
Expatriate footballers in France
Zambian expatriate sportspeople in France
Expatriate footballers in Portugal
Zambian expatriate sportspeople in Portugal
Expatriate footballers in the Democratic Republic of the Congo
Zambian expatriate sportspeople in the Democratic Republic of the Congo
FIFA Century Club